PPC Ltd, a supplier of cement, lime (material) and related products in southern Africa. It has 11 cement factories and a lime manufacturing facility in six African countries including South Africa, Botswana, Democratic Republic of the Congo, Ethiopia, Rwanda and Zimbabwe. The company is headquartered in Sandton (Johannesburg).

PPC’s Materials business, consisting of Pronto Holdings (including Pronto Building Materials, Ulula Ash and 3Q Mahuma Concrete), forms part of the company’s channel management strategy for southern Africa. PPC’s footprint in the readymix sector has grown to include 29 batching plants across South Africa and Mozambique and also has the capacity to produce half a million tons of fly ash. PPC also produces aggregates in South Africa and Botswana.

PPC Lime, one of the largest lime producers in the southern hemisphere, produces metallurgical-grade calcitic and dolomitic lime and sinter stone used mainly in the steel and related industries. In 2019, PPC Ltd indicated that currency depreciation in Zimbabwe had negatively affected the group's bottom-line.

References

External links
 Why S&P is upbeat on PPC As of 3 July 2018 (Available via subscription only).
 AfriSam Cancels Head of Terms With PPC A of 25 August 2018. 
 PPC Limited Integrated Report 2018 As of 23 August 2018.

Cement companies of South Africa
Manufacturing companies based in Johannesburg
Companies based in Sandton
South African brands
Companies listed on the Johannesburg Stock Exchange